An Earth anthem is a celebratory song or a musical composition that eulogizes, extols or exalts the planet Earth.

History

Songs composed for the United Nations

Voices for Today
Voices for Today is a song composed by Benjamin Britten in 1965 to commemorate the 20th anniversary of the foundation of the United Nations. The lyrics are based on Virgil’s fourth Eclogue and also include quotes professing peace taken form world literature.

Hymn to the United Nations 
On the request of then United Nations Secretary-General U Thant, a Hymn to the United Nations was performed on the occasion of its 26th anniversary, on October 24, 1971, by Pablo Casals, the lyrics to which were penned by the poet W. H. Auden. Thant first approached Casals, who was a personal friend, looking to create a hymn to peace and hoping for the song to be based on the preamble of the Charter of the United Nations. Thant later commissioned Auden to write the poem after Casals requested one to set to music. Auden completed his work in three days time. The finished work, scored for chorus and orchestra, takes approximately seven minutes to play. However, there were never any plans to adopt the song as the organization's official anthem.

Songs about Earth 
There are a number of songs or a musical composition that eulogizes, extols or exalts the planet Earth. One is "World Anthem" by the Mindshare Institute and Foundation. Other songs on the same theme include "Earth Anthem" by The Turtles (later covered by Dan Fogelberg), "Mother Earth (Natural Anthem)" by Neil Young, "Earth Song" by Michael Jackson, "Earth Hour Anthem" by Andrew Huang and "Earth Anthem" by Abhay Kumar.
The "Earth Day Anthem" lyrics by William Wallace (and sometimes the original lyrics by Barbara George) are widely sung to the tune of "Ode to Joy" by Ludwig van Beethoven to celebrate Earth Day. Another song about earth is "Earth" by Lil Dicky.

Call for an official Earth anthem 
The call for an official Earth Anthem was made by the Permanent Delegation of India in Paris to UNESCO in January 2014.

See also
 Flag of Earth
 Global citizenship

References

Anthems